This is the list of Belgian ministers of Development Cooperation.

List of ministers

2000–

Lists of government ministers of Belgium